Pep is a multinational retail company based in Cape Town, South Africa. Founded in 1965, Pep operated in 11 countries in Southern Africa with the opening of an outlet in Lobito, Angola in November 2008. As of November 2009, the company reported over 1400 stores in operation, with total employment equalling 14,000 employees. It also owns and runs the largest clothing factory in southern Africa, where it manufactures much of its clothing.

Pep's target market is the mass lower- to middle-income end of the market.  As such it seeks to sell low-cost clothes and is the largest single-brand retailer in South Africa.  Pep is a subsidiary of Pepkor.

History 
In 1971, Whitey Basson was approached by Renier van Rooyen to become the financial director of the retail clothing chain that van Rooyen had founded called Pep Stores Ltd (or as it was locally known "Pep"). Van Rooyen was planning to list the company on the JSE as Pepkor. Basson agreed to join the company as financial director and in 1974 became head of operations. 

By 1981, Pep had grown to 500 stores, 10 factories, 12 000 employees and a turnover of close to R300 million. At this point Christo Wiese bought out van Rooyen's holdings in Pepkor and became the major shareholder. Wiese became the chairman of Pepkor.

In 2014 Wiese sold Pepkor to Steinhoff International in exchange for about 20% of Steinhoff's issued shares.

References

Retail companies established in 1965
Companies based in Cape Town